Norman Court was a composite built clipper ship, designed by William Rennie, measuring 197.4 ft x 33 ft x 20 ft, of 833.87 tons net. The ship was built in 1869 by A. & J. Inglis of Glasgow. On the night of 29 March 1883 in a strong gale she was driven ashore and wrecked in Cymyran Bay, between Rhoscolyn and Rhosneigr, Anglesey. All bar two of the crew were saved by lifeboats from nearby Holyhead. Andrew Shewan was captain of the Norman Court from her launch until he retired in ill-health in 1873, following an extraordinarily difficult passage from China. His son, also Andrew Shewan, who had previously sailed as first mate, became captain. It was this son Andrew Shewan who recounted many tales of the ship and of the clipper ships in his book Great Days Of Sail: Reminiscences of a Tea Clipper Captain, published in 1926 when he could plausibly claim to be the last surviving tea clipper captain. He died in December 1927.

References

External links
 The Final Voyage of the "Norman Court"
 Story of the wreck of the 'Norman Court' at Cymyran
 Painting of clipper ship Norman Court, San Francisco Public Library
The Wreck of the Norman Court - Worsley Sub-aqua club page with photographs of the wreck
 - approximate location of the wreck

Clippers
Individual sailing vessels
Tall ships of the United Kingdom
Ships built in Glasgow
1869 ships
Full-rigged ships
1869 establishments in Scotland
Shipwrecks of Wales
Sailing ships of Scotland